Turkmen, Türkmen, Turkoman, or Turkman may refer to:

Peoples

Historical ethnonym
 Turkoman (ethnonym), ethnonym used for the Oghuz Turks during the Middle Ages

Ethnic groups
 Turkmen in Anatolia and the Levant (Seljuk and Ottoman-Turkish descendants):
 Iraqi Turkmen, a Turkish minority living mostly in the Turkmeneli region in northern Iraq
 Turks in Israel, a Turkish minority living in Israel 
 Turks in Lebanon, a Turkish minority living in Lebanon  
 Syrian Turkmen, a Turkish minority living mostly in northern Syria
 Yörüks, a semi-nomadic group in Anatolia often referred to as Turkmen in Turkey
 Anatolian beyliks, small principalities in Anatolia governed by Beys, late 11th–13th centuries
  Turkmens, a Turkic people native to Central Asia living primarily in Turkmenistan and North Caucasus
 Iranian Turkmens, Turkmen minority living in Iran
 Afghan Turkmens, Turkmen minority living in Afghanistan
 Turkmen in Pakistan, mostly Turkmen refugees from Afghanistan and Turkmenistan living in Pakistan 
 Turkmen tribes, the major modern Turkmen tribes that live in Turkmenistan, Iran and Afghanistan

Other uses for people
 Qarapapaqs or Terekeme, an ethnic minority living in Turkey, Iran and the South Caucasus
 Oghuz Turks, a large branch of Turkic peoples, historically Muslim nomadic Oghuz Turks (in the 10th–18th centuries)

Languages

Eastern Oghuz
Turkmen language, the official language of Turkmenistan
Turkmen alphabet, used for official purposes in Turkmenistan

Western Oghuz
Iraqi Turkmen/Turkman dialects, a Turkish dialect in Iraq
Syrian Turkmen/Turkman dialects, a Turkish dialect in Syria

Places

Afghanistan
 Turkman Valley

Azerbaijan
 Türkmən, Barda
 Türkmən, Goychay
 Türkmən, Qabala

Iran 
 Turkmen Sahra
 Torkamanchay
 Torkaman County
 Central District (Torkaman County)
 Bandar Torkaman
 Torkaman, West Azerbaijan
 Tappeh Torkaman
 Qarah Tappeh, Torkaman

Iraq
Turkmeneli

Northern Cyprus
Kontea, known in Turkish as Türkmenköy

Syria
Turkmen Mountain

Turkey
 Türkmen, Çüngüş
 Türkmen, Emirdağ
 Türkmen, Gölpazarı
 Türkmen, Keşan
 Türkmen, Vezirköprü
 Türkmenakören, Emirdağ

Turkmenistan
Türkmenabat
Türkmenbaşy, Turkmenistan

Surname
 Behçet Türkmen (1899–1968), Turkish military officer
 Doğan Türkmen (fl. 1980), Turkish diplomat attacked by the Justice Commandos of the Armenian Genocide
 Ekin Türkmen (born 1984), Turkish actress
 Elif Doğan Türkmen (born 1962), Turkish politician
 Emre Turkmen, a member of the London-based music band Years & Years
 Hüseyin Türkmen, (born 1998) Turkish football player 
 İlter Türkmen (1927–2022), Turkish diplomat
 Muhammed Türkmen (born 1986), Turkish football player
 Özer Türkmen (born c. 1939), head of the army of the Turkish Republic of Northern Cyprus
 Tayfun Türkmen (born 1978), Turkish football player

Culture
 Music of Turkmenistan
 Turkmen rug, a type of handmade floor-covering originating in Central Asia

Media
 Türkmen Owazy, a music TV channel in Turkmenistan 
 Türkmeneli TV, a bilingual (Arabic and Turkish) TV channel based in Iraq and Turkey

Other uses
 Someone or something related to Turkmenistan

Animals
 Hybrid camel, sometimes called a Turkoman
 Central Asian Shepherd Dog, known as the Turkmen Alabai
 Turkoman horse, or Turkmene, an extinct breed of horse from Turkmenistan
 Turkmenian kulan, Equus hemionus kulan, a type of wild ass
 Turkoman (horse) (born 1982), an American Thoroughbred racehorse

Films
 Torkaman (film), a 1974 Iranian film

See also
 List of Turkic dynasties and countries
 Turkestan Autonomous Soviet Socialist Republic
 Turkmen manat, the currency of Turkmenistan
 Turkoman people (disambiguation)

Language and nationality disambiguation pages